Lu and Bun is a 2009 Vietnamese computer-animated comedy-adventure television series produced by Vietkite Media.

Plot
Lion Lu and rabbit Bun were friends, but they have characters and favourites which were different each other. So, there're many funny and dramatic situations which happened.

External links
 Director Phùng Văn Hà : Vietnamese animation'll get up - Tuổi Trẻ Online // Webnesday, June 3, 2009 (08:13 ~ UTC+7)

2000s animated television series
Vietnamese computer-animated films
Vietnamese animated television series
Animated films about lions
Animated films about rabbits and hares
Animated television series about lions
Animated television series about rabbits and hares